Harbour cleanup may refer to:

 Halifax Harbour Solutions
 Saint John, New Brunswick harbour cleanup
 Boston Harbor pollution and cleanup efforts